The Claremont Historic District is a national historic district located at Arlington County, Virginia. It contains 253 contributing buildings in a residential neighborhood in southwestern Arlington. The area was developed initially between 1946 and 1949, of two-story Colonial Revival style houses and -story Cape Cod style houses. In 1954, thirty-six Ranch-style houses were added.

It was listed on the National Register of Historic Places in 2006.

References

Neighborhoods in Arlington County, Virginia
Unincorporated communities in Virginia
Washington metropolitan area
Houses on the National Register of Historic Places in Virginia
Colonial Revival architecture in Virginia
Historic districts in Arlington County, Virginia
National Register of Historic Places in Arlington County, Virginia
Houses in Arlington County, Virginia
Historic districts on the National Register of Historic Places in Virginia